Henry Butland (11 February 1872 – 2 December 1956) was a rugby union player who represented New Zealand in the national side (the All Blacks), playing in the halfback position.

Born in Westport in 1872, he represented West Coast at a provincial level. He was a member of the All Blacks in 1893 and 1894, playing nine matches for the team, but no internationals.

Following the death of Robert Oliphant in January 1956, Butland was the oldest living All Black. He died on 2 December 1956 and was buried at Hokitika Cemetery.

References

1872 births
1956 deaths
Burials at Hokitika Cemetery
New Zealand international rugby union players
New Zealand rugby union players
Rugby union players from Westport, New Zealand
Rugby union scrum-halves
West Coast rugby union players